The ICW World Heavyweight Championship was a professional wrestling world heavyweight championship of International Championship Wrestling. Many title defenses featured matches between Randy Savage and his real-life brother Lanny Poffo. After the original ICW shut down in 1984, Paul Christy started his own ICW promotion. The title history in 1979 is not clear. It is possible that Randy Savage won the title in July rather than on March 13. In addition, one source does not recognize the title changes between Savage and Poffo between this reign and 1982, as it claims that Savage won the title in 1979 and held it for over four years before dropping it to Christy. Because the championship is a professional wrestling championship, it is not won or lost competitively but instead by the decision of the bookers of a wrestling promotion. The championship is awarded after the chosen team "wins" a match to maintain the illusion that professional wrestling is a competitive sport.

Title history

Footnotes

References

International Championship Wrestling championships
World heavyweight wrestling championships